Queensland Airports Limited is an Australian Airport consortium in charge of two separate Airport consortia in the state of Queensland, Australia. Under the two consortia, it is in charge of four airports; Gold Coast, Longreach, Mount Isa and Townsville.

History
Queensland Airports (QA) was established in 2003 as part of corporate restructure of the shareholding of Gold Coast Airport, with it taking 100% ownership of the airport. In March 2005, QA acquired Mount Isa Airport and Townsville Airport. In 2012 it purchased Longreach Airport. It is a privately owned company with investment trusts and superannuation funds its shareholders.

References

External links
Company website

Airports in Queensland
Companies based on the Gold Coast, Queensland
2003 establishments in Australia